Anorthosis Famagusta is a Cypriot cultural and sports club that was established in 1911. It has had many presidents over the years, including some honorary presidents. This article has a complete list of presidents of the club.

Anorthosis Famagusta association presidents 

This is a complete list of all presidents of the Anorthosis Famagusta sports club.

Anorthosis Famagusta (Football) Public LTD presidents 

In 2014, Christos Poullaidis rescued Anorthosis financially and created a public company for the footballing department of the club, Anorthosis Famagusta (Football) Public LTD, of which there is a president. This is a different position to the association president, the role is to control only the football club and not the other activities of Anorthosis. Here is a complete list of them.

References 

Anorthosis Famagusta
Anorthosis Famagusta F.C.